Chorągiew (literally: "banner") was the basic administrative unit of the Polish and Lithuanian cavalry from the 14th century. An alternative name until the 17th century was Rota.

14th to 17th centuries 
Between the 14th and 17th century the Chorągiew was composed of smaller sub-units – the Poczet.

Types of Chorągiew were:
  (District banner), formed by knights of a district.
  (Clan banner), formed by clans.
  (Court banner), formed by troops of the King.

15th century (2nd half) to 18th century (1st half) 
In the cavalry, since the second half of the 15th century until the first half of the 18th century, a Chorągiew was formed according to the "companion system" (system zaciągu towarzyskiego). See: Towarzysz (companion).

Types of Chorągiew were:
  (Hussar banner), formed by Hussars.
  ("Light" banner), formed by light-cavalry.
  ("Armoured" banner), formed by Pancerni.
  (Tatar banner), formed by Tatars.
  (Vlach banner), light cavalry, not only  formed by Vlachs.
  (Cossack banner), light cavalry, not only formed by Cossacks.

Typical family/village clans of the Chorągiew Rodowa who provided men for battles consisting of approximately 100 men were:
 Topór, Dołęga and Gryf

Gallery

References

 PWN Leksykon: Wojsko, wojna, broń, Wydawnictwo Naukowe PWN, Warszawa 2001, 
Winged Hussars, Radoslaw Sikora, Bartosz Musialowicz, BUM Magazine, October 2016.

Military history of the Polish–Lithuanian Commonwealth
Polish cavalry